Samuel Roberts (born April 14, 1998) is an American football defensive end for the New England Patriots of the National Football League (NFL). He played college football at Northwest Missouri State.

Professional career
Roberts was drafted by the New England Patriots in the sixth round, 200th overall, of the 2022 NFL Draft.

References

External links
 New England Patriots bio
 Northwest Missouri State Bearcats bio

1998 births
Living people
American football defensive tackles
Northwest Missouri State Bearcats football players
New England Patriots players